Education in India is primarily managed by state-run public education system, which fall under the command of the government at three levels: central, state and local. Under various articles of the Indian Constitution and the Right of Children to Free and Compulsory Education Act, 2009, free and compulsory education is provided as a fundamental right to children aged 6 to 14. The approximate ratio of public schools to private schools in India is 7:5.

Education system 
Up until 1976, education policies and implementation were determined legally by each of India's constitutional states. The 42nd amendment to the constitution in 1976 made education a 'concurrent subject'. From this point on the central and state governments shared formal responsibility for funding and administration of education. In a country as large as India, now with 28 states and eight union territories, this means that the potential for variations between states in the policies, plans, programs and initiatives for elementary education is vast. Periodically, national policy frameworks are created to guide states in their creation of state-level programs and policies. State governments and local government bodies manage the majority of primary and upper primary schools and the number of government-managed elementary schools is growing. Simultaneously the number and proportion managed by private bodies is growing. In 2005-6 83.13% of schools offering elementary education (Grades 1–8) were managed by government and 16.86% of schools were under private management (excluding children in unrecognised schools, schools established under the Education Guarantee Scheme and in alternative learning centers). Of those schools managed privately, one third are 'aided' and two thirds are 'unaided'. Enrolment in Grades 1–8 is shared between government and privately managed schools in the ratio 73:27. However in rural areas this ratio is higher (80:20) and in urban areas much lower (36:66).

In the 2011 Census, about 73% of the population was literate, with 81% for males and 65% for females. National Statistical Commission surveyed literacy to be 77.7% in 2017–18, 84.7% for male and 70.3% for female. This compares to 1981 when the respective rates were 41%, 53% and 29%. In 1951 the rates were 18%, 27% and 9%. India's improved education system is often cited as one of the main contributors to its economic development. Much of the progress, especially in higher education and scientific research, has been credited to various public institutions. While enrolment in higher education has increased steadily over the past decade, reaching a Gross Enrolment Ratio (GER) of 26.3% in 2019, there still remains a significant distance to catch up with tertiary education enrolment levels of developed nations, a challenge that will be necessary to overcome in order to continue to reap a demographic dividend from India's comparatively young population.

Poorly resourced public schools which suffer from high rates of teacher absenteeism may have encouraged the rapid growth of private (unaided) schooling in India, particularly in urban areas. Private schools divide into two types: recognized and unrecognized schools. Government 'recognition' is an official stamp of approval and for this, a private school is required to fulfill a number of conditions, though hardly any private schools that get 'recognition' actually fulfill all the conditions of recognition.

At the primary and secondary level, India has a large private school system complementing the government run schools, with 29% of students receiving private education in the 6 to 14 age group. Certain post-secondary technical schools are also private. The private education market in India had a revenue of US$450 million in 2008, but is projected to be a US$40 billion market.

As per the Annual Status of Education Report (ASER) 2012, 96.5% of all rural children between the ages of 6–14 were enrolled in school. This is the fourth annual survey to report enrolment above 96%. India has maintained an average enrolment ratio of 95% for students in this age group from year 2007 to 2014. As an outcome the number of students in the age group 6–14 who are not enrolled in school has come down to 2.8% in the academic year 2018 (ASER 2018). Another report from 2013 stated that there were 229 million students enrolled in different accredited urban and rural schools of India, from Class I to XII, representing an increase of 2.3 million students over 2002 total enrolment, and a 19% increase in girl's enrolment. While quantitatively India is inching closer to universal education, the quality of its education has been questioned particularly in its government run school system. While more than 95 per cent of children attend primary school, just 40 per cent of Indian adolescents attend secondary school (Grades 9–12).
Since 2000, the World Bank has committed over $2 billion to education in India. Some of the reasons for the poor quality include absence of around 25% of teachers every day. States of India have introduced tests and education assessment system to identify and improve such schools. The Human Rights Measurement Initiative finds that India is achieving only 79.0% of what should be possible at its level of income for the right to education.

Although there are private schools in India, they are highly regulated in terms of what they can teach, in what form they can operate (must be a non-profit to run any accredited educational institution) and all the other aspects of the operation. Hence, the differentiation between government schools and private schools can be misleading. However, in a report by Geeta Gandhi Kingdon entitled: The Emptying of Public Schools and Growth of Private Schools in India, it is said that for sensible education-policy making, it is vital to take account of the various changing trends in the size of the private and public schooling sectors in India. Ignoring these trends involves the risk of poor policies/legislation, with adverse effects on children's education.

In January 2019, India had over 900 universities and 40,000 colleges. In India's higher education system, a significant number of seats are reserved under affirmative action policies for the historically disadvantaged Scheduled Castes and Scheduled Tribes and Other Backward Classes. In universities, colleges, and similar institutions affiliated to the central government, there is a maximum 50% of reservations applicable to these disadvantaged groups, at the state level it can vary. Maharashtra had 73% reservation in 2014, which is the highest percentage of reservations in India.

History

Early education in India commenced under the supervision of a guru or preceptor after initiation. The education was delivered through Gurukula. The relationship between Guru and his Shishya (students /disciples) was very important part of the education. Takshasila (in modern-day Pakistan) is one of the example of ancient higher learning institute in India from possibly 8th century BCE, however, it is debatable whether it could be regarded a university or not in modern sense, since teachers living there may not have had official membership of particular colleges, and there did not seem to have existed purpose-built lecture halls and residential quarters in a Taxila, in contrast to the later Nalanda university in eastern India. Nalanda was the oldest university-system of education in the world in the modern sense of university. There all subjects were taught in the Pali language.

Secular institutions cropped up along Buddhist monasteries. These institutions imparted practical education, e.g. medicine. A number of urban learning centres became increasingly visible from the period between 500 BCE to 400 CE. The important urban centers of learning were Nalanda (in modern-day Bihar) and Manassa in Nagpur, among others. These institutions systematically imparted knowledge and attracted a number of foreign students to study topics such as Buddhist Páli literature, logic, páli grammar, etc. Chanakya, a Brahmin teacher, was among the most famous teachers, associated with founding of Mauryan Empire.

Shramanas and Brahmanas historically offered education by means of donations, rather than charging fees or the procurement of funds from students or their guardians. Later, stupas, temples also became centers of education; religious education was compulsory, but secular subjects were also taught. Students were required to be brahmacaris or celibates. The knowledge in these orders was often related to the tasks a section of the society had to perform. Arts, crafts, Ayurveda, architecture were taught

With the advent of Islam in India the traditional methods of education increasingly came under Islamic influence. Pre-Mughal rulers such as Qutb-ud-din Aybak and other Muslim rulers initiated institutions which imparted religious knowledge. Scholars such as Nizamuddin Auliya and Moinuddin Chishti became prominent educators and established Islamic monasteries. Students from Bukhara and Afghanistan visited India to study humanities and science. Islamic institution of education in India included traditional madrassas and maktabs which taught grammar, philosophy, mathematics, and law influenced by the Greek traditions inherited by Persia and the Middle East before Islam spread from these regions into India. A feature of this traditional Islamic education was its emphasis on the connection between science and humanities.

British rule and the subsequent establishment of educational institutions saw the introduction of English as a medium of instruction. Some schools taught the curriculum through vernacular languages with English as a second language. The term "pre-modern" was used for three kinds of schools – the Arabic and Sanskrit schools which taught Muslim or Hindu sacred literature and the Persian schools which taught Persian literature. The vernacular schools across India taught reading and writing the vernacular language and arithmetic. British education became solidified into India as missionary schools were established during the 1820s.

Educational stages

School education 

Education in India is a Concurrent List subject, that is both the Indian central government, and the state governments have responsibility for enacting and implementing education policy.
The central board and most of the state boards uniformly follow the "10+2" pattern of education. In this pattern, study of 10 years is done in schools and 2 years in Junior colleges (Maharashtra) or Higher Secondary Schools(most other states), and then 3 years of study for a bachelor's degree. The first 10 years is further subdivided into 8 years of elementary education (5 years Primary School and 3 years Middle School), 2 years of Secondary education followed by 2 years of Higher Secondary Schools or Junior colleges. This pattern originated from the recommendation of the Education Commission of 1964–66.

There are two types of educational institutions in India, 1) Recognized institutions – primary school, secondary school, special schools, intermediate schools, colleges and universities who follow courses as prescribed by universities or boards and are also open for inspection by these authorities , 2) Unrecognized Institutions, which do not fulfill conditions as stated for the recognized ones.

Administration

Policy
Education policy is prepared by the Central Government and State Governments at national and state levels respectively. The National Policy on Education (NPE), 1986, has provided for environment awareness, science and technology education, and introduction of traditional elements such as Yoga into the Indian secondary school system. A significant feature of India's secondary school system is the emphasis on inclusion of the disadvantaged sections of the society. Professionals from established institutes are often called to support in vocational training. Another feature of India's secondary school system is its emphasis on profession based vocational training to help students attain skills for finding a vocation of his/her choosing. A significant new feature has been the extension of SSA to secondary education in the form of the Rashtriya Madhyamik Shiksha Abhiyan. Rashtriya Madhyamik Shiksha Abhiyan (RMSA) which is the most recent initiative of Government of India to achieve the goal of universalisation of secondary education (USE). It is aimed at expanding and improving the standards of secondary education up to class X.

Curriculum and school education boards

National Skill Development Agency (NSDA)'s National Skills Qualification Framework (NSQF), is a quality assurance framework which grades and recognises levels of skill based on the learning outcomes acquired through both formal or informal means.

School boards set the curriculum, conduct standardised exams mostly at 10th and 12th level to award the school diplomas. Exams at the remaining levels (also called standard, grade or class, denoting the years of schooling) are conducted by the schools.

 National Council of Educational Research and Training (NCERT): The NCERT is the apex body located at New Delhi, Capital City of India. It makes the curriculum related matters for school education across India. The NCERT provides support, guidance and technical assistance to a number of schools in India and oversees many aspects of enforcement of education policies. There are other curriculum bodies governing school education system specially at state level called SCERTs.
 State government boards of education: Most of the state governments have at least one "State board of secondary school education". However, some states like Andhra Pradesh have more than one. Also the union territories do not have a board. Chandigarh, Dadra and Nagar Haveli, Daman and Diu, and Lakshadweep and Puducherry Lakshadweep share the services with a larger state. The boards set curriculum from Grades 1 to 12 for affiliated schools. The curriculum varies from state to state and has more local appeal with examinations conducted in regional languages in addition to English – often considered less rigorous than national curricula such as CBSE or ICSE/ISC. Most of these conduct exams at 10th and 12th level, but some even at the 5th and 8th level.
 Central Board of Secondary Education (CBSE): The CBSE sets curriculum from Grades 9 to 12 for affiliated schools and conducts examinations at the 10th and 12th levels. Students studying the CBSE Curriculum take the All India Secondary School Examination (AISSE) at the end of grade 10 and All India Senior School Certificate Examination (AISSCE) at the end of grade 12. Examinations are offered in Hindi and English.
 Council for the Indian School Certificate Examinations (CISCE): CISCE sets curriculum from Grades 1 to 12 for affiliated schools and conducts three examinations, namely, the Indian Certificate of Secondary Education (ICSE – Class/Grade 10); The Indian School Certificate (ISC – Class/Grade 12) and the Certificate in Vocational Education (CVE – Class/Grade 12). CISCE English level has been compared to UK's A-Levels; this board offers more choices of subjects. CBSE exams at grade 10 and 12 have often been compared with ICSE and ISC examinations. ICSE is generally considered to be more rigorous than the CBSE AISSE (grade 10) but the CBSE AISSCE and ISC examinations are almost on par with each other in most subjects with ISC including a slightly more rigorous English examination than the CBSE 12th grade examination. The CBSE and ISC are recognised internationally and most universities abroad accept the final results of CBSE and ISC exams for admissions purposes and as proof of completion of secondary school.
National Institute of Open Schooling (NIOS): The NIOS conducts two examinations, namely, Secondary Examination and Senior Secondary Examination (All India) and also some courses in Vocational Education. National Board of education is run by Government of India's HRD Ministry to provide education in rural areas and challenged groups in open and distance education mode. A pilot project started by CBSE to provide high class affordable education, provides education up to 12th standard. Choice of subjects is highly customisable and equivalent to CBSE. Home-schooled students usually take NIOS or international curriculum examinations as they are ineligible to write CBSE or ISC exams.
 Hindu, vedic & sanskrit education: The Maharshi Sandipani Rashtriya Veda Sanskrit Shiksha Board (MSRVSSB) is a national-level school education board which grants the Veda Bhushan (10th) and Veda Vibhushan (12th) certificates to students of affiliated schools. MSRVSSB certificates are accredited by the Association of Indian Universities (AIU) and AICTE as the recognised qualifications for admission into other tertiary institutions for a higher degree. Along with the modern subjects, the students are also taught Hindu scriptures, vedas, upnishads, ayurveda and sanskrit. Govt of India has granted legal authority to MSRVSSB to affiliate and recognise vedic and sanskrit schools run by other organisations. MSRVSSB is run by the Maharishi Sandipani Rashtriya Ved Vidya Pratishthan (MSRVVP), which already runs several vedic school and MSRVSSB also accrredits schools run by other organisations.
 Islamic madrasah: Their boards are controlled by local state governments, or autonomous, or affiliated with Darul Uloom Deoband or Darul Uloom Nadwtul Ulama.
 Autonomous schools: Such as Woodstock School, Sri Aurobindo International Centre of Education Puducherry, Patha Bhavan and Ananda Marga Gurukula.
 International Baccalaureate (IB) and Cambridge International Examinations (CAIE): These are generally private schools that have dual affiliation with one of the school education board of India as well as affiliated to the International Baccalaureate (IB) Programme and/or the Cambridge International Examinations (CAIE).
 International schools, which offer 10th and 12th standard examinations under the International Baccalaureate, Cambridge Senior Secondary Examination systems or under their home nations school boards (such as run by foreign embassies or the expat communities).

Midday Meal Scheme

The Midday Meal Scheme is a school meal programme of the Government of India designed to improve the nutritional status of school-age children nationwide, by supplying free lunches on working days for children in primary and upper primary classes in government, government aided, local body, Education Guarantee Scheme, and alternative innovative education centres, Madarsa and Maqtabs supported under Sarva Shiksha Abhiyan, and National Child Labour Project schools run by the ministry of labour. Serving 120,000,000 children in over 1,265,000 schools and Education Guarantee Scheme centres, it is one of the largest in the world.

With the twin objectives of improving health and education of the poor children, India has embarked upon an ambitious scheme of providing mid day meals (MDM) in the government and government-assisted primary schools. The administrative and logistical responsibilities of this scheme are enormous, and, therefore, offering food stamps or income transfer to targeted recipients is considered as an alternative.

In a welcome move, Government of India made special allocations for Midday Meal Scheme during nationwide lockdown and school closure period of COVID-19 to continue nutrition delivery to children. However, many experts have differing opinions on ground level implementation of MDM amid pandemic and its actual benefit delivered to school children.

Teacher Training

In addition, NUEPA (National University of Educational Planning and Administration) and NCTE (National Council for Teacher Education) are responsible for the management of the education system and teacher accreditation.

Levels of schooling

Pre-primary education

The pre-primary stage is the foundation of children's knowledge, skills and behaviour. On completion of pre-primary education, the children are sent to the primary stage but pre-primary education in India is not a fundamental right. In rural India, pre-primary schools are rarely available in small villages. But in cities and big towns, there are many established players in the pre-primary education sector. The demand for the preschools is growing considerably in the smaller towns and cities but still, only 1% of the population under age 6 is enrolled in preschool education.
 Play group (pre-nursery): At playschools, children are exposed to a lot of basic learning activities that help them to get independent faster and develop their self-help qualities like eating food themselves, dressing up, and maintaining cleanliness. The age limit for admission into pre-nursery is 2 to 3 years. Anganwadi is government-funded free rural childcare & Mothercare nutrition and learning program also incorporating the free Midday Meal Scheme.
 Nursery: Nursery level activities help children unfold their talents, thus enabling them to sharpen their mental and physical abilities. The age limit for admission in nursery is 3 to 4 years.
 Lower Kindergarten: It is also called the junior kindergarten (Jr. kg) stage. The age limit for admission in LKG is 4 to 5 years.
 Upper Kindergarten: It is also called the senior kindergarten (Sr. kg) stage. The age limit for admission in UKG is 5 to 6 years.
LKG and UKG stages prepare and help children emotionally, mentally, socially and physically to grasp knowledge easily in the later stages of school and college life. A systematic process of preschool education is followed in India to impart knowledge in the best possible way for a better understanding of the young children. By following an easy and interesting curriculum, teachers strive hard to make the entire learning process enjoyable for the children.

Primary education

The primary education in India is divided into two parts, namely Lower Primary (Class I-V) and Upper Primary (Middle school, Class VI-VIII). The Indian government lays emphasis on primary education (Class I-VIII) also referred to as elementary education, to children aged 6 to 14 years old. Because education laws are given by the states, duration of primary school visit alters between the Indian states. The Indian government has also banned child labour in order to ensure that the children do not enter unsafe working conditions. However, both free education and the ban on child labour are difficult to enforce due to economic disparity and social conditions. 80% of all recognised schools at the elementary stage are government run or supported, making it the largest provider of education in the country.

However, due to a shortage of resources and lack of political will, this system suffers from massive gaps including high pupil to teacher ratios, shortage of infrastructure and poor levels of teacher training. Figures released by the Indian government in 2011 show that there were 5,816,673 elementary school teachers in India.  there were 2,127,000 secondary school teachers in India. Education has also been made free for children for 6 to 14 years of age or up to class VIII under the Right of Children to Free and Compulsory Education Act 2009.

There have been several efforts to enhance quality made by the government. The District Education Revitalisation Programme (DERP) was launched in 1994 with an aim to universalise primary education in India by reforming and vitalising the existing primary education system. 85% of the DERP was funded by the central government and the remaining 15% was funded by the states. The DERP, which had opened 160,000 new schools including 84,000 alternative education schools delivering alternative education to approximately 3.5 million children, was also supported by UNICEF and other international programs. "Corruption hurts the poor disproportionately – by diverting funds intended for development, undermining a government's ability to provide basic services, feeding inequality and injustice, and discouraging foreign investment and aid" (Kofi Annan, in his statement on the adoption of the United Nations Convention against Corruption by the General Assembly, NY, November 2003). In January 2016, Kerala became the 1st Indian state to achieve 100% primary education through its literacy programme Athulyam.

This primary education scheme has also shown a high gross enrolment ratio of 93–95% for the last three years in some states. Significant improvement in staffing and enrolment of girls has also been made as a part of this scheme. The scheme for universalisation of Education for All is the Sarva Shiksha Abhiyan which is one of the largest education initiatives in the world. Enrolment has been enhanced, but the levels of quality remain low.

Secondary Education

Secondary education covers children aged 14 to 18, a group comprising 88.5 million children according to the 2001 Census of India. The final two years of secondary is often called Higher Secondary (HS), Senior Secondary, or simply the "+2" stage. The two-halves of secondary education are each an important stage for which a pass certificate is needed, and thus are affiliated by boards of education under education ministry, before one can pursue higher education, including college or professional courses.

UGC, NCERT, CBSE and ICSE directives state qualifying ages for candidates who wish to take the standardised exams. Those at least 15 years old by 30 May for a given academic year are eligible to appear for Secondary School certificate exams, and those 17 by the same date are eligible to appear for Higher Secondary certificate exams. It is further stated that upon successful completion of Higher Secondary, one can apply to higher education under UGC control.

Secondary education in India is examination-oriented and not course-based: students register for and take classes primarily to prepare for one of the centrally-administered examinations. Secondary school is split into 2 parts (grades 9–10 and grades 11–12) with a standardised nationwide examination at the end of grade 10 and grade 12 (colloquially referred to as "board exams"). Grade 10 examination results can be used for admission into grades 11–12 at a secondary school, pre-university program, or a vocational or technical school. Passing the grade 12 board examination leads to the granting of a secondary school completion diploma, which may be used for admission into vocational schools or universities in the country or the world.

Most schools in India do not offer subject and scheduling flexibility due to budgeting constraints (for example, students in India are often not allowed to take Chemistry and History in grades 11–12 as they are part of different "streams"). Private candidates (that is, not studying in a school) are generally not allowed to register for, and take board examinations, but there are some exceptions such as NIOS.

Students taking the grade 10 examination usually take five or six subjects: Two languages(at least one of them being English/Hindi), Mathematics, Science(often taught as three separate disciplines: physics, chemistry and biology; but assessed as a single subject), Social Sciences(consisting of four components: history, geography, economics and political science), and one optional subject depending on the availability of teachers. Elective or optional subjects often include computer applications, commerce, painting, music and home science.

Students taking the grade 12 examination usually take five or six subjects with English or the local language being compulsory. Students re-enrolling in most secondary schools after grade 10 have to make the choice of choosing subjects from a "core stream" in addition to the language: Science (Mathematics, Biology, Physics, Chemistry, Computer Science, Biotechnology, Physical Education), Commerce (Accountancy, Business Studies, Economics, Entrepreunership, Informatics Practices), or Humanities (History, Political Science, Sociology, Psychology, Geography, Legal Studies, Fine Arts, Music, Dance) depending on the school. Students with the Science stream study mathematics up to single-variable calculus in grade 12.

Most reputable universities in India require students to pass college-administered admissions tests in addition to passing a final secondary school examination for entry into a college or university. School grades are usually not sufficient for college admissions in India. Popular entrance tests include JEE, NEET and the recent CUET.

Types of schools

Government schools
The majority of Indian children attend government run schools. Education is free socially and economically for children until the age of 14. An Education Ministry data from 2017 showed that 65.2% (113 million,) of all school students in 20 states attend government schools (c. 2017). These include schools runs by the state and local government as well as the central government. Example of large center government run school systems are Kendriya Vidyalaya in urban areas, Jawahar Navodaya Vidyalaya for the gifted students, Kasturba Gandhi Balika Vidyalaya for girls belonging to vulnerable SC/ST/OBC classes, and Indian Army Public Schools run by the Indian Army for the children of military personnel.

Kendriya Vidyalaya project, was started for the employees of the central government of India, who are deployed throughout the country. The government started the Kendriya Vidyalaya project in 1965 to provide uniform education in institutions following the same syllabus at the same pace regardless of the location to which the employee's family has been transferred.

Government aided private schools

These are usually charitable trust run schools that receive partial funding from the government. Largest system of aided schools is run by D.A.V. College Managing Committee.

Private schools (unaided)
 
According to a survey an estimate, 29% of Indian children were privately educated in 2014. With more than 50% children enrolling in private schools in urban areas, the balance has already tilted towards private schooling in cities; and, even in rural areas, nearly 20% of the children in 2004-5 were enrolled in private schools.

Most middle-class families send their children to private schools, mostly in their own city, but also at boarding schools. Private schools have been established since the British Rule in India and St George's School, Chennai is the oldest private school in India. At such schools, the medium of education is often English, but Hindi and/or the state's official language is also taught as a compulsory subject. Pre-school education is mostly limited to organised neighbourhood nursery schools with some organised chains. Montessori education is also popular, due to Maria Montessori's stay in India during World War II. In 2014, four of the top ten pre-schools in Chennai were Montessori.

Many privately owned and managed schools carry the appellation "Public", such as the Delhi Public Schools, or Frank Anthony Public Schools. These are modelled after British public schools, which are a group of older, expensive and exclusive fee-paying private independent schools in England.

According to some research, private schools often provide superior results at a multiple of the unit cost of government schools. The reason being high aims and better vision. However, others have suggested that private schools fail to provide education to the poorest families, a selective being only a fifth of the schools and have in the past ignored Court orders for their regulation. Research with children from the same family, in which one child attends private school and the other receives a government education, has found barely any difference in their attainment. This has led some analysts to argue that the better test scores achieved by private schools in general is primarily a result of 'background advantages' enjoyed by privately educated children because they tend come from wealthier families than their government-educated peers. Such advantages may, for example, include having more educational resources at home.

In their favour, it has been pointed out that private schools cover the entire curriculum and offer extra-curricular activities such as science fairs, general knowledge, sports, music and drama. The pupil teacher ratios are much better in private schools (1:31 to 1:37 for government schools) and more teachers in private schools are female. There is some disagreement over which system has better educated teachers. According to the latest DISE survey, the percentage of untrained teachers (para-teachers) is 54.91% in private, compared to 44.88% in government schools and only 2.32% teachers in unaided schools receive in-service training compared to 43.44% for government schools. The competition in the school market is intense, yet most schools make profit.
However, the number of private schools in India is still low – the share of private institutions is 7% (with upper primary being 21% secondary 32% – source: fortress team research). Even the poorest often go to private schools despite the fact that government schools are free. A study found that 65% school-children in Hyderabad's slums attend private schools.

National schools

 Atomic Energy Central School (established in 1969)
 Bal Bharati Public School (established in 1944)
 Bharatiya Vidya Bhavan (established in 1938)
 Chinmaya Vidyalaya (established in 1965)
 DAV Public School (established in 1886) 
 Delhi Public School (established in 1949)
 Indian Army Public Schools (established in 1983)
 Jawahar Navodaya Vidyalaya (established in 1986) 
 Kendriya Vidyalaya (established in 1963)
 Padma Seshadri Bala Bhavan (established in 1958) 
 Railway Schools in India (established in 1873)
 Ramakrishna Mission Schools (established in 1922) 
 Ryan International Schools (established in 1976) 
 Sainik School (established in 1960)
 Saraswati Shishu Mandir (established in 1952)
 Seth M.R. Jaipuria Schools (established in 1992) 
 Vivekananda Vidyalaya (established in 1972)
 Vivekananda Kendra Vidyalaya (established in 1977) 
 Waldorf Schools (India) (established in 2002)

International schools
, the International Schools Consultancy (ISC) listed India as having 410 international schools. ISC defines an 'international school' in the following terms "ISC includes an international school if the school delivers a curriculum to any combination of pre-school, primary or secondary students, wholly or partly in English outside an English-speaking country, or if a school in a country where English is one of the official languages, offers an English-medium curriculum other than the country's national curriculum and is international in its orientation." This definition is used by publications including The Economist.

Home-schooling
Home-schooling in India is legal, though it is the less explored option, and often debated by educators. The Indian Government's stance on the issue is that parents are free to teach their children at home, if they wish to and have the means. The then HRD Minister Kapil Sibal has stated that despite the RTE Act of 2009, if someone decides not to send his/her children to school, the government would not interfere.

Non-governmental work in education

NGO work in Indian education broadly spans four areas – piloting approaches to multigrade teaching, making improvements to learning environments, teacher training and support, and creating stronger school-community links.

NGO involvement in education has been crucial in delivering targeted action to under resourced communities, such as Scheduled Castes, Scheduled Tribes, the urban poor, children engaged in child labor, children with disabilities, etc. The Sarva Shiksha Abhiyan (SSA) recognized the role played by NGOs in ensuring access to education, particularly for students with disabilities. NGOs contributed to SSA by either leading advocacy movements for persons with disabilities or providing various types of assistance in rural settings for children with disabilities.

Under the SSA, NGOs also engaged in collaboration with the state to reach children excluded from mainstream education, including migrant children, child laborers, dropouts, children living in areas with civil instability and girls. There are 79,960 registered NGOs working in the areas of education and literacy. Partnerships under the SSA can occur through funding by Central and State governments, funding activities by identified National and State Resource Institutions or through participation in community activities of various Village Education Committees.

Grassroots education NGOs often deliver services via local governing institutions such as the Panchayati Raj and emphasize community participation in ensuring quality. The Mamidipudi Venkatarangaiya Foundation (MVF), established in 1991 to address literacy among child laborers utilized Parent Teacher Associations to disburse seed money for the program under the supervision of the village Panchayat, which then took issues of staffing shortage and insufficient infrastructure to the State Government. The Pratham Educational Initiative in Delhi and Mumbai works with the Integrated Child Development Scheme to set up and provide support to community-run pre-school centers or balwadis. Under the Namma Shaale project in Karnataka, the Azim Premji Foundation identified seven key stakeholders (children, teachers, parents, School Development and Monitoring Committees, Community Based Organizations, Gram Panchayats, and education managers) in their work to establish a framework of school-community leadership.

NGOs also work with the State to enable teacher training. There have been a number of NGO partnerships with local District Institute of Educational Training. The Rishi Valley Institute for Educational Resources (RIVER) has worked with school districts in many Indian states to provide multi-grade, multi-level training approaches catering to the needs of remote one-room schools. The Eklavya Foundation in Madhya Pradesh has been working with the State Council for Education Research and Training since 1987 to train teachers in making learning a joyful experience by emphasizing skill development and practical learning in the sciences.

NGOs have historically been associated with non-formal education (NFE) programs, both in providing alternative pedagogical approaches as well as substitutes to mainstream education. The Bharat Gyan Vigyan Samiti, for instance, emphasizes "science and literacy for national integration and self-reliance" and uses approaches such as the Gyan Vigyan Vidyalayas to encourage long-term engagement in literacy.

Studies in NGO involvement in education have criticized the adoption of NGO models into formal schooling as low-cost options that require institutional mechanisms to avoid undermining the State's financial responsibility in providing elementary education. The cost‐effectiveness of NGO programs has yet to be determined. In studies that demonstrate that NGOs are more cost-effective in the Global South, there have been concerns raised that this is accomplished by cutting ethical corners, such as underpayment of NGO workers.

Higher education

Students may opt for vocational education or university education.

Vocational education
India's All India Council of Technical Education (AICTE) reported, in 2013, that there are more than 4,599 vocational institutions that offer degrees, diploma and post-diploma in architecture, engineering, hotel management, infrastructure, pharmacy, technology, town services and others. There were 1,740,000 students enrolled in these schools. Total annual intake capacity for technical diplomas and degrees exceeded 3.4 million in 2012.

According to the University Grants Commission (UGC) total enrolment in Science, Medicine, Agriculture and Engineering crossed 65 lakh in 2010. The number of women choosing engineering has more than doubled since 2001.

Tertiary education

After passing the Higher Secondary Examination (the Standard 12 examination), students may enroll in general degree programmes such as bachelor's degree (graduation) in arts, commerce or science, or professional degree programme such as engineering, medicine, nursing, pharmacy, and law graduates. India's higher education system is the third largest in the world, after China and the United States. The main governing body at the tertiary level is the University Grants Commission (India) (UGC), which enforces its standards, advises the government, and helps co-ordinate between the centre and the state up to Post graduation and Doctorate (PhD). Accreditation for higher learning is overseen by 12 autonomous institutions established by the University Grants Commission.

, India has 152 central universities, 316 state universities, and 191 private universities. Other institutions include 33,623 colleges, including 1,800 exclusive women's colleges, functioning under these universities and institutions, and 12,748 Institutions offering Diploma Courses. The emphasis in the tertiary level of education lies on science and technology. Indian educational institutions by 2004 consisted of a large number of technology institutes. Distance learning is also a feature of the Indian higher education system. The Government has launched Rashtriya Uchchattar Shiksha Abhiyan to provide strategic funding to State higher and technical institutions. A total of 316 state public universities and 13,024 colleges will be covered under it.

Some institutions of India, such as the Indian Institutes of Technology (IITs) and National Institutes of Technology (NITs) have been globally acclaimed for their standard of under-graduate education in engineering. Several other institutes of fundamental research such as the Indian Institute of Science (IISc) Indian Association for the Cultivation of Science (IACS), Tata Institute of Fundamental Research (TIFR), Harish-Chandra Research Institute (HRI), Jawaharlal Nehru Centre for Advanced Scientific Research (JNCASR), Indian Institute of Science Education and Research (IISER) are also acclaimed for their standard of research in basic sciences and mathematics. However, India has failed to produce world class universities both in the private sector or the public sector.

Besides top rated universities which provide highly competitive world class education to their pupils, India is also home to many universities which have been founded with the sole objective of making easy money. Regulatory authorities like UGC and AICTE have been trying very hard to extirpate the menace of private universities which are running courses without any affiliation or recognition. Indian Government has failed to check on these education shops, which are run by big businessmen & politicians. Many private colleges and universities do not fulfil the required criterion by the Government and central bodies (UGC, AICTE, MCI, BCI etc.) and take students for a ride. For example, many institutions in India continue to run unaccredited courses as there is no legislation strong enough to ensure legal action against them. Quality assurance mechanisms have failed to stop misrepresentations and malpractices in higher education. At the same time regulatory bodies have been accused of corruption, specifically in the case of deemed-universities. In this context of lack of solid quality assurance mechanism, institutions need to step-up and set higher standards of self-regulation.

The Government of India is aware of the plight of higher education sector and has been trying to bring reforms, however, 15 bills are still awaiting discussion and approval in the Parliament. One of the most talked about bill is Foreign Universities Bill, which is supposed to facilitate entry of foreign universities to establish campuses in India. The bill is still under discussion and even if it gets passed, its feasibility and effectiveness is questionable as it misses the context, diversity and segment of international foreign institutions interested in India. One of the approaches to make internationalisation of Indian higher education effective is to develop a coherent and comprehensive policy which aims at infusing excellence, bringing institutional diversity and aids in capacity building.

Three Indian universities were listed in the Times Higher Education list of the world's top 200 universities – Indian Institutes of Technology, Indian Institutes of Management, and Jawaharlal Nehru University in 2005 and 2006. Six Indian Institutes of Technology and the Birla Institute of Technology and Science—Pilani were listed among the top 20 science and technology schools in Asia by Asiaweek. The Indian School of Business situated in Hyderabad was ranked number 12 in global MBA rankings by the Financial Times of London in 2010 while the All India Institute of Medical Sciences has been recognised as a global leader in medical research and treatment. The University of Mumbai was ranked 41 among the Top 50 Engineering Schools of the world by America's news broadcasting firm Business Insider in 2012 and was the only university in the list from the five emerging BRICS nations viz Brazil, Russia, India, China and South Africa. It was ranked at 62 in the QS BRICS University rankings for 2013 and was India's 3rd best Multi-Disciplinary University in the QS University ranking of Indian Universities after University of Calcutta and Delhi University. In April 2015, IIT Bombay launched the first U.S.-India joint EMBA program alongside Washington University in St. Louis.

Technical education

From the first Five-year Plan onwards, India's emphasis was to develop a pool of scientifically inclined manpower. India's National Policy on Education (NPE) provisioned for an apex body for regulation and development of higher technical education, which came into being as the All India Council for Technical Education (AICTE) in 1987 through an act of the Indian parliament. At the central level, the Indian Institutes of Technology, the Indian Institute of Space Science and Technology, the National Institutes of Technology and the Indian Institutes of Information Technology are deemed of national importance.

The Indian Institutes of Technology (IITs) and National Institutes of Technology (NITs) are among the nation's premier education facilities.

 The UGC has inter-university centers at a number of locations throughout India to promote common research, e.g. the Nuclear Science Centre at the Jawaharlal Nehru University, New Delhi. Besides there are some British established colleges such as Harcourt Butler Technological Institute situated in Kanpur and King George Medical University situated in Lucknow which are important centre of higher education.

In addition to above institutes, efforts towards the enhancement of technical education are supplemented by a number of recognised Professional Engineering Societies such as:

 Institution of Engineers (India)
 Institution of Civil Engineers (India)
 Institution of Mechanical Engineers (India)
 Institution of Chemical Engineering (India)
 Institution of Electronics and Tele-Communication Engineers (India)
 Indian Institute of Metals
 Institution of Industrial Engineers (India)
 Institute of Town Planners (India)
 Indian Institute of Architects
that conduct Engineering/Technical Examinations at different levels (Degree and diploma) for working professionals desirous of improving their technical qualifications.

The number of graduates coming out of technical colleges increased to over 700,000 in 2011 from 550,000 in FY 2010. However, according to one study, 75% of technical graduates and more than 85% of general graduates lack the skills needed in India's most demanding and high-growth global industries such as Information Technology. These high-tech global information technologies companies directly or indirectly employ about 2.3 million people, less than 1% of India's labour pool. India offers one of the largest pool of technically skilled graduates in the world. Given the sheer numbers of students seeking education in engineering, science and mathematics, India faces daunting challenges in scaling up capacity while maintaining quality.

Open and distance learning
At the school level, Board of Open Schooling and Skill Education, Sikkim (BOSSE), National Institute of Open Schooling (NIOS) provides opportunities for continuing education to those who missed completing school education. 1.4 million students are enrolled at the secondary and higher secondary level through open and distance learning. In 2012 various state governments also introduced "State Open School" to provide distance education.

At higher education level, Indira Gandhi National Open University (IGNOU) co-ordinates distance learning. It has a cumulative enrolment of about 1.5 million, serviced through 53 regional centres and 1,400 study centres with 25,000 counselors. The Distance Education Council (DEC), an authority of IGNOU is co-coordinating 13 State Open Universities and 119 institutions of correspondence courses in conventional universities. While distance education institutions have expanded at a very rapid rate, but most of these institutions need an up gradation in their standards and performance. There is a large proliferation of courses covered by distance mode without adequate infrastructure, both human and physical. There is a strong need to correct these imbalances.

Massive open online course are made available for free by the HRD ministry and various educational institutes.

Online education 

Online education in India started during the COVID-19 pandemic. However only a small proportion of the Indian population has access to online education. The Ministry of Human Resource Development (MHRD) recently launched the 'Bharat Padhe Online'.
The Indian government has imposed one of the longest school closures globally as it suffered through multiple waves of the COVID-19 pandemic. These school closures have revealed the inequities between urban and rural populations, as well as between girls and boys, in adapting to online learning tools.

Deaf education in India

History of education in India for the DHH population 
India is very diverse with eight main religions, hundreds of ethnic groups, and 21 languages with hundreds of dialects. This diversity has made it difficult to educate deaf or hard of hearing (DHH) people in India for generations.

There is a history of educating the deaf in India, however, there is no single clear approach to their education. This stems from conditions, some similar to those faced around the world, and others unique to India. For example, prior to independence of India, there were not clear laws and protections for the disabled. Since independence, advancements have been made for rights of the disabled, but this has not fully tackled the issue.

Pre-independence there were only 24 schools for the deaf in India, and all of these used an oral approach. The belief was that using sign language would hinder advancements of hearing and speaking in deaf children. Additionally, there was no single Indian sign language, so signs would differ depending on where the school was located.

Post-independence, there are more services and resources available for DHH people, however, challenges with education remain. There are organizations around the country that work to advance the spread and quality of education for the deaf.

Education for DHH children 
Oralism and the use of sign language are two competing approaches to education for DHH people. While oralism dominates in India, which is an approach that encourages speaking and hearing, it is usually not realistic for DHH children.

There is an Indian Sign Language, however, it is not formally recognized by the government and it is not complete or comprehensive. It varies around the country and is not encouraged by professionals and educators. Beliefs of the past that the use of sign language will hinder the potential advancements of hearing and speaking in DHH children remain. In recent years, there has been a notion to encourage the use of sign language in India and teach it in schools. In 2017, the first ISL dictionary was released.

Due to these challenges and beliefs associated with sign language, education for DHH people in India often focuses on teaching children to hear, speak, and read lips, this is known as an oral approach.

In India there are regular schools and special schools. Special schools provide education for children with different disabilities. Special schools can be beneficial to DHH children, and provide a better education than they would receive in a regular school. However, these schools aren't available for every deaf child. Sometimes they are located too far from a child's home. Another reason a child may have to attend a regular school is if they receive hearing technology. Since India focuses on hearing and speaking for the deaf, hearing technology is encouraged. Once a child receives hearing technology it is believed that they can attend regular schools. Even with hearing technology, DHH children still need special education in order to succeed. This puts them at a significant disadvantage in regular school and can cause them to fall behind academically, linguistically, and developmentally. For these reasons, many deaf children receive poor education or no education at all, causing the illiteracy rate of deaf children to rise.

Education in India in regular schools and deaf schools has problems. Even in deaf schools, sign language isn't usually taught and used. Some use a small amount of sign language but all of the deaf schools in India use or claim to use an oral approach. Some deaf schools secretly teach sign language due to the stigma and beliefs surrounding the use of sign language, and disability in general, in India. Children in deaf schools have to try to learn by hearing or reading lips and writing. In hearing schools, the children have to do the same. There are no special accommodations. Additionally, there aren't any teachers that use sign language in regular schools (maybe a few in deaf schools), and there aren't any interpreters.

There are a couple of hundred deaf schools in India and vocational training is becoming more common for DHH people.

Higher education 
There are no deaf colleges or universities in India. A person's education ends with grade school- where they likely weren't able to learn. With lack of education, DHH people then have a very difficult time finding a job.

There is one interpreter in one college in India, Delhi University.

Quality

Literacy

According to the Census of 2011, "every person above the age of 7 years who can read and write with understanding in any language is said to be literate". According to this criterion, the 2011 survey holds the national literacy rate to be 74.04%. The youth literacy rate, measured within the age group of 15 to 24, is 81.1% (84.4% among males and 74.4% among females), while 86% of boys and 72% of girls are literate in the 10–19 age group.

Within the Indian states, Kerala has the highest literacy rate of 93.91% whereas Bihar averaged 61.8% literacy. The 2001 statistics indicated that the total number of 'absolute non-literates' in the country was 304 million. Gender gap in literacy rate is high, for example in Rajasthan, the state with the lowest female literacy rate in India, average female literacy rate is 52.66% and average male literacy rate is 80.51%, making a gender gap of 27.85%.

Attainment
, enrolment rates are 58% for pre-primary, 93% for primary, 69% for secondary, and 25% for tertiary education.

Despite the high overall enrolment rate for primary education among rural children of age 10, half could not read at a basic level, over 60% were unable to do division, and half dropped out by the age of 14.

In 2009, two states in India, Tamil Nadu and Himachal Pradesh, participated in the international PISA exams which is administered once every three years to 15-year-old's. Both states ranked at the bottom of the table, beating out only Kyrgyzstan in score, and falling 200 points (two standard deviations) below the average for OECD countries. While in the immediate aftermath there was a short-lived controversy over the quality of primary education in India, ultimately India decided to not participate in PISA for 2012, and again not to for 2015 and 2018.

While the quality of free, public education is in crisis, a majority of the urban poor have turned to private schools. In some urban cities, it is estimated as high as two-thirds of all students attend private institutions, many of which charge a modest US$2 per month.

Public school workforce
Officially, the pupil to teacher ratio within the public school system for primary education is 35:1. However, teacher absenteeism in India is exorbitant, with 25% never showing up for work. The World Bank estimates the cost in salaries alone paid to no-show teachers who have never attended work is US$2 billion per year.

A study on teachers by Kremer etc. found out that 25% of private sector teachers and 40% of public sector medical workers were absent during the survey. Among teachers who were paid to teach, absence rates ranged from 14.6% in Maharashtra to 41.9% in Jharkhand. Only 1 in nearly 3,000 public school head teachers had ever dismissed a teacher for repeated absence. The same study found "only about half were teaching, during unannounced visits to a nationally representative sample of government primary schools in India."

Higher education
As per "Report of the Higher education in India, Issues Related to Expansion, Inclusiveness, Quality and Finance", the access to higher education measured in term of gross enrolment ratio increased from 0.7% in 1950/51 to 1.4% in 1960–61. By 2006/7 the GER increased to about 11%. Notably, by 2012, it had crossed 20% (as mentioned in an earlier section).

According to a survey by All India Survey on Higher Education (AISHE) released by the ministry of human resource development, Tamil Nadu which has the highest gross enrolment ratio (GER) in higher education in the country has registered an increase of 2.6% to take GER to 46.9 per cent in 2016–17.

Vocational education
An optimistic estimate from 2008 was that only one in five job-seekers in India ever had any sort of vocational training.
However it's expected to grow as the CBSE has brought changes in its education system which emphasises inclusion of certain number and types of vocational subjects in classes 9th and 11th. Although it's not mandatory for schools to go for it but a good number of schools have voluntarily accepted the suggestion and incorporated the change in their curriculum.

Issues

Facilities
As per 2016 Annual Survey of Education Report (ASER), 3.5% schools in India had no toilet facility while only 68.7% schools had usable toilet facility. 75.5% of the schools surveyed had library in 2016, a decrease from 78.1% in 2014. Percentage of schools with separate girls toilet have increased from 32.9% in 2010 to 61.9%in 2016. 74.1% schools had drinking water facility and 64.5% of the schools had playground.

Curriculum issues
Modern education in India is often criticised for being based on rote learning rather than problem solving. Anil K. Rajvanshi writes that Indian education system seems to be producing zombies since in most of the schools students seemed to be spending majority of their time in preparing for competitive exams rather than learning or playing. Preschool for Child Rights states that almost 99% of pre-schools do not have any curriculum at all. Also creativity is not encouraged or is considered a form of entertainment in most institutions.

The British "essentialist" view of knowledge of the nineteenth century emphasised the individual, scientific, universal, and moral aims of education ahead of the social and cultural. This, combined with the colonial construction of Indian society, designed to preserve the ideological lead of the Empire post-1857, it helped shape the official nineteenth-century school curriculum. The rejection of nationalist Gopal Krishna Gokhale's Bill (1911) to make primary education free and compulsory by the colonial administration and English-educated and often upper-caste elite further helped sustain a curriculum that focused on colonial objectives. Holmes and McLean (1989, 151) argues that despite tensions between the colonial view of education and the nationalist postcolonial aims of education, British essentialism grew unassailable roots in India partly because "colonial values coincided with those of indigenous traditions."

Rural education

Following independence, India viewed education as an effective tool for bringing social change through community development. The administrative control was effectively initiated in the 1950s, when, in 1952, the government grouped villages under a Community Development Block—an authority under a national programme which could control education in up to 100 villages.

Setty and Ross elaborate on the role of such programmes, themselves divided further into individual-based, community based, or the Individual-cum-community-based, in which microscopic levels of development are overseen at village level by an appointed worker:

Despite some setbacks the rural education programmes continued throughout the 1950s, with support from private institutions. A sizeable network of rural education had been established by the time the Gandhigram Rural Institute was established and 5,200 Community Development Blocks were established in India. Nursery schools, elementary schools, secondary school, and schools for adult education for women were set up.

The government continued to view rural education as an agenda that could be relatively free from bureaucratic backlog and general stagnation. However, in some cases lack of financing balanced the gains made by rural education institutes of India. Some ideas failed to find acceptability among India's poor and investments made by the government sometimes yielded little results. Today, government rural schools remain poorly funded and understaffed. Several foundations, such as the Rural Development Foundation (Hyderabad), actively build high-quality rural schools, but the number of students served is small.

Education in rural India is valued differently from in an urban setting, with lower rates of completion. An imbalanced sex ratio exists within schools with 18% of males earning a high school diploma compared with only 10% of females. The estimated number of children who have never attended school in India is near 100 million which reflects the low completion levels. This is the largest concentration in the world of youth who haven't enrolled in school.

Women's education

Women have a much lower literacy rate than men. Far fewer girls are enrolled in the schools, and many of them drop out. In the patriarchal setting of the Indian family, girls have lower status and fewer privileges than boys. Conservative cultural attitudes prevent some girls from attending school. Furthermore, educated high class women are less likely than uneducated low class women to enter the workforce They opt to stay at home due to the traditional, cultural and religious norms.

The number of literate women among the female population of India was between 2–6% from the British Raj onward to the formation of the Republic of India in 1947. Concerted efforts led to improvement from 15.3% in 1961 to 28.5% in 1981. By 2001 literacy for women had exceeded 50% of the overall female population, though these statistics were still very low compared to world standards and even male literacy within India. Recently the Indian government has launched Saakshar Bharat Mission for Female Literacy. This mission aims to bring down female illiteracy by half of its present level.

Sita Anantha Raman outlines the progress of women's education in India:

Sita Anantha Raman also mentions that while the educated Indian women workforce maintains professionalism, the men outnumber them in most fields and, in some cases, receive higher income for the same positions.

The education of women in India plays a significant role in improving livings standards in the country. A higher female literacy rate improves the quality of life both at home and outside the home, by encouraging and promoting education of children, especially female children, and in reducing the infant mortality rate. Several studies have shown that a lower level of women literacy rates results in higher levels of fertility and infant mortality, poorer nutrition, lower earning potential and the lack of an ability to make decisions within a household. Women's lower educational levels is also shown to adversely affect the health and living conditions of children. A survey that was conducted in India showed results which support the fact that infant mortality rate was inversely related to female literacy rate and educational level. The survey also suggests a correlation between education and economic growth.

In India, there is a large disparity between female literacy rates in different states. State of Kerala has the highest female literacy rate of 91.98% while Rajasthan has the lowest female literacy rate of 52.66. This correlates to the health levels of states, Kerala has average life expectancy at birth of 74.9 while Rajasthan's average life expectancy at birth is 67.7 years.

In India, higher education is defined as the education of an age group between 18 and 24, and is largely funded by the government. Despite women making up 24–50% of higher education enrolment, there is still a gender imbalance within higher education. Only one third of science students and 7% of engineering students, are women. In comparison, however, over half the students studying Education are women.

Accreditation
In 2018, 277 fake engineering colleges were identified. In January 2010, the Government of India decided to withdraw Deemed university status from as many as 44 institutions. The Government claimed in its affidavit that academic considerations were not being kept in mind by the management of these institutions and that "they were being run as family fiefdoms". In February 2009, the University Grant Commission found 39 fake institutions operating in India.

Employer training
Only 16% of manufacturers in India offer in-service training to their employees, compared with over 90% in China.

Teacher careers

In the Indian education system, a teacher's success is loosely defined. It is either based on a student's success or based on the years of teaching experience, both of which do not necessarily correlate to a teacher's skill set or competencies. The management of an institution could thereby be forced to promote teachers based on the grade level they teach or their seniority, both of which are often not an indicator of a good teacher. This means that either a primary school teacher is promoted to a higher grade, or a teacher is promoted to take up other roles within the institution such as Head of Department, coordinator, Vice Principal or Principal. However, the skills and competencies that are required for each of them vary and a great teacher may not be a great manager. Since teachers do not see their own growth and success in their own hands, they often do not take up any professional development. Thus, there is a need to identify a framework to help a teacher chart a career path based on his/her own competency and help them understand their own development.

Coaching
Increased competition to get admission in reputed colleges has given rise to private coaching institutes in India. They prepare students for engineering, medical, MBA, banking jobs' entrance tests as well as American SAT and GRE. There are also coaching institutes that teach subjects like English for employment in India and abroad.

Private coaching institutes are of two types: offline coaching and online coaching. There are many online coaching centres and apps available in the market and their usage is growing, especially in tier 2 metro cities.

A 2013 survey by ASSOCHAM predicted the size of private coaching industry to grow to $40 billion, or Rs 2.39 trillion (short scale) by 2015.

Kota in Rajasthan is the called the capital of engineering and medical colleges' entrance's coaching sector. In Punjab, English language is taught by coaching institutes for foreign visa aspirants to get the right IELTS score for their applications. Mukherjee Nagar and Old Rajinder Nagar in Delhi are considered a hub for UPSC Civil Services Examination coaching. To compete in these exams, Center and some state governments also provide free coaching to students, especially to students from minority communities.

Coaching classes have been blamed for the neglect of school education by students. Educationists such as Anandakrishnan have criticised the increasing importance being given to coaching classes as they put students under mental stress and the coaching fees add to the financial burden on parents. These educationists opine that if a good schooling system is put in place, children should not need additional coaching to take any competitive examination.

Corruption in education

Corruption in Indian education system has been eroding the quality of education and has been creating long-term negative consequences for the society. Educational corruption in India is considered one of the major contributors to domestic black money. In 2021, Manav Bharti University, a private university, was accused of selling tens of thousands of degrees for money over a decade.

Grade inflation
Grade inflation has become an issue in Indian secondary education. In CBSE, a 95 per cent aggregate is 21 times as prevalent today as it was in 2004, and a 90 per cent close to nine times as prevalent. In the ISC Board, a 95 per cent is almost twice as prevalent today as it was in 2012. CBSE called a meeting of all 40 school boards early in 2017 to urge them to discontinue "artificial spiking of marks". CBSE decided to lead by example and promised not to inflate its results. But although the 2017 results have seen a small correction, the board has clearly not discarded the practice completely. Almost 6.5 per cent of mathematics examinees in 2017 scored 95 or more – 10 times higher than in 2004 – and almost 6 per cent of physics examinees scored 95 or more, 35 times more than in 2004.

Initiatives

Central government involvement

Following India's independence, a number of rules were formulated for the backward Scheduled Castes and the Scheduled Tribes of India. In 1960, a list identifying 405 Scheduled Castes and 225 Scheduled Tribes was published by the central government. An amendment was made to the list in 1975, which identified 841 Scheduled Castes and 510 Scheduled Tribes. The total percentage of Scheduled Castes and Scheduled Tribes combined was found to be 22.5% with the Scheduled Castes accounting for 17% and the Scheduled Tribes accounting for the remaining 7.5%. Following the report many Scheduled Castes and Scheduled Tribes increasingly referred to themselves as Dalit, a Marathi language terminology used by B R Ambedkar which literally means "oppressed".

The Scheduled Castes and Scheduled Tribes are provided for in many of India's educational programmes. Special reservations are also provided for the Scheduled Castes and Scheduled Tribes in India, e.g. a reservation of 15% in Kendriya Vidyalaya for Scheduled Castes and another reservation of 7.5% in Kendriya Vidyalaya for Scheduled Tribes. Similar reservations are held by the Scheduled Castes and Scheduled Tribes in many schemes and educational facilities in India. The remote and far-flung regions of North-East India are provided for under the Non-Lapsible Central pool of Resources (NLCPR) since 1998–1999. The NLCPR aims to provide funds for infrastructure development in these remote areas.

Women from remote, underdeveloped areas or from weaker social groups in Andhra Pradesh, Assam, Bihar, Jharkhand, Karnataka, Kerala, Gujarat, Uttar Pradesh, and Uttarakhand, fall under the Mahila Samakhya Scheme, initiated in 1989. Apart from provisions for education this programme also aims to raise awareness by holding meetings and seminars at rural levels. The government allowed  during 2007–08 to carry out this scheme over 83 districts including more than 21,000 villages.

There are 68 Bal Bhavans and 10 Bal Kendra affiliated to the National Bal Bhavan. The scheme involves educational and social activities and recognising children with a marked talent for a particular educational stream. A number of programmes and activities are held under this scheme, which also involves cultural exchanges and participation in several international forums.

India's minorities, especially the ones considered 'educationally backward' by the government, are provided for in the 1992 amendment of the Indian National Policy on Education (NPE). The government initiated the Scheme of Area Intensive Programme for Educationally Backward Minorities and Scheme of Financial Assistance or Modernisation of Madarsa Education as part of its revised Programme of Action (1992). Both these schemes were started nationwide by 1994. In 2004 the Indian parliament passed an act which enabled minority education establishments to seek university affiliations if they passed the required norms.

Ministry of Human Resource and Development, Government of India in collaboration with Ministry of Electronics & Information Technology has also launched a National Scholarship Portal to provide students of India access to National and State Level Scholarships provided by various government authorities. As a Mission Mode Project under the National e-Governance Plan (NeGP), the online service enlists more than 50 scholarship programs every year including the renowned Ministry of Minority Affairs (MOMA) Scholarships for Post-Matric and Pre-Matric studies. In the academic year 2017–18 the MOMA Scholarships facilitated the studies of 116,452 students with scholarships worth ₹3165.7 million. The National Scholarship continues to enlist scholarship programs managed by AICTE (All India Council for Technical Education), UGC (University Grants Commission) and respective state governments.

Legislative framework
Article 45, of the Constitution of India originally stated:

This article was a directive principle of state policy within India, effectively meaning that it was within a set of rules that were meant to be followed in spirit and the government could not be held to court if the actual letter was not followed. However, the enforcement of this directive principle became a matter of debate since this principle held obvious emotive and practical value, and was legally the only directive principle within the Indian constitution to have a time limit.

Following initiatives by the Supreme Court of India during the 1990s the 93rd amendment bill suggested three separate amendments to the Indian constitution:

The constitution of India was amended to include a new article, 21A, which read:

Article 45 was proposed to be substituted by the article which read:

Another article, 51A, was to additionally have the clause:

The bill was passed unanimously in the Lok Sabha, the lower house of the Indian parliament, on 28 November 2001. It was later passed by the upper house—the Rajya Sabha—on 14 May 2002. After being signed by the President of India the Indian constitution was amended formally for the eighty sixth time and the bill came into effect. Since then those between the age of 6–14 have a fundamental right to education.

Article 46 of the Constitution of India holds that:

Other provisions for the Scheduled Castes and Scheduled Tribes can be found in Articles 330, 332, 335, 338–342. Both the 5th and the 6th Schedules of the Constitution also make special provisions for the Scheduled Castes and Scheduled Tribes.

Central government expenditure on education 
As a part of the tenth Five-year Plan (2002–2007), the central government of India outlined an expenditure of 65.6% of its total education budget of  i.e.  on elementary education; 9.9% i.e.  on secondary education; 2.9% i.e.  on adult education; 9.5% i.e.  on higher education; 10.7% i.e.  on technical education; and the remaining 1.4% i.e.  on miscellaneous education schemes.

During the Financial Year 2011–12, the Central Government of India has allocated  38,957 crore for the Department of School Education and Literacy which is the main department dealing with primary education in India. Within this allocation, major share of  21,000 crore, is for the flagship programme 'Sarva Siksha Abhiyan'. However, budgetary allocation of  210,000 million is considered very low in view of the officially appointed Anil Bordia Committee recommendation of  356.59 billion for the year 2011–12. This higher allocation was required to implement the recent legislation 'Right of Children to Free and Compulsory Education Act, 2009. In recent times, several major announcements were made for developing the poor state of affairs in education sector in India, the most notable ones being the National Common Minimum Programme (NCMP) of the United Progressive Alliance (UPA) government. The announcements are;
(a) To progressively increase expenditure on education to around 6% of GDP.
(b) To support this increase in expenditure on education, and to increase the quality of education, there would be an imposition of an education cess over all central government taxes.
(c) To ensure that no one is denied of education due to economic backwardness and poverty.
(d) To make right to education a fundamental right for all children in the age group 6–14 years.
(e) To universalise education through its flagship programmes such as Sarva Shiksha Abhiyan and Midday Meal Scheme.

However, even after five years of implementation of NCMP, not much progress has been seen on this front. Although the country targeted towards devoting 6% share of the GDP towards the educational sector, the performance has definitely fallen short of expectations. Expenditure on education has steadily risen from 0.64% of GDP in 1951–52 to 2.31% in 1970–71 and thereafter reached the peak of 4.26% in 2000–01. However, it declined to 3.49% in 2004–05. There is a definite need to step-up again. As a proportion of total government expenditure, it has declined from around 11.1% in 2000–2001 to around 9.98% during UPA rule, even though ideally it should be around 20% of the total budget. A policy brief issued by [Network for Social Accountability (NSA)] titled "[NSA Response to Education Sector Interventions in Union Budget: UPA Rule and the Education Sector] " provides significant revelation to this fact. Due to a declining priority of education in the public policy paradigm in India, there has been an exponential growth in the private expenditure on education also. [As per the available information, the private out of pocket expenditure by the working class population for the education of their children in India has increased by around 1150 per cent or around 12.5 times over the last decade].

National Education Policy 2020
The central government of India introduced the National Education Policy 2020 (NEP 2020) which is expected to bring profound changes to education in India.
The policy, approved by the Cabinet of India on 27
July 2020, outlines the vision of India's new education system. The new policy replaces the 1986 National Policy on Education. The policy is a comprehensive framework for elementary education to higher education as well as vocational training in both rural and urban India. It aims to transform India's education system by 2021.

The National Education Policy 2020 has 'emphasised' on the use of mother tongue or local language as the medium of instruction till Class 5 while, recommending its continuance till Class 8 and beyond. It also states that no language will be imposed on the students. The language policy in NEP is a broad guideline and advisory in nature; and it is up to the states, institutions, and schools to decide on the implementation. Education in India is a Concurrent List subject.

NEP 2020 outlines the vision of India's School education system. The new policy replaces the previous National Policy on Education, 1986. The policy is a comprehensive framework for elementary education to higher education as well as vocational training in both rural and urban India. The policy aims to transform India's education system by 2021. As per NEP2020, the "10 + 2" structure is replaced with "5+3+3+4" model. 5+3+3+4 refers to 5 foundational years, whether in an anganwadi, pre-school or balvatika. This is followed by 3 years of preparatory learning from classes 3 to 5. This is followed by a middle stage that is of 3 years in length and finally a 4 year secondary stage till class 12 or 18 years of age. This model will be implemented as follows:

Instead of exams being held every academic year, school students attend three exams, in classes 2, 5 and 8. Board exams are held for classes 10 and 12. Standards for Board exams is established by an assessment body, PARAKH (Performance Assessment, Review and Analysis of Knowledge for Holistic Development). To make them easier, these exams would be conducted twice a year, with students being offered up to two attempts. The exam itself would have two parts, namely the objective and the descriptive.

NEP's higher education policy proposes a 4-year multi-disciplinary bachelor's degree in an undergraduate programme with multiple exit options. These will include professional and vocational areas and will be implemented

 A certificate after completing 1 year of study (vocational)
 A diploma after completing 2 years of study (vocational)
 A Bachelor's degree after completion of a 3-year program (professional)
 A 4-year multidisciplinary Bachelor's degree (the preferred option) (professional)

Conceptual understanding of inclusive education 
The new National Education Policy 2020 (NEP 2020) introduced by the Central Government is expected to bring profound changes to education in India.
The policy approved by the Union Cabinet of India on 29 July 2020, outlines the vision of India's new education system. The new policy replaces the 1986 National Policy on Education. The policy is a comprehensive framework for elementary education to higher education as well as vocational training in both rural and urban India. The policy aims to transform India's education system by 2021.

Shortly after the release of the policy, the government clarified that no one will be forced to study any particular language and that the medium of instruction will not be shifted from English to any regional language. The language policy in NEP is a broad guideline and advisory in nature; and it is up to the states, institutions, and schools to decide on the implementation. Education in India is a Concurrent List subject.

Although it may not be appropriate to judge the adoption of a northern concept in the south from a northern perspective, hasty use of such globalised terminology without engaging with the thinking behind it may present no more than empty rhetoric, whatever the context. clearly perceives inclusive education as "…a concept that has been adopted from the international discourse, but has not been engaged with in the Indian scenario." She supports this view of lack of conceptual engagement through data collected in semi-structured interviews for her PhD research, where she found that: Many interviewees concurred with the opinions reflected in government documents that inclusion is about children with special needs, as reflected by a disabling condition. A handful of others argue that inclusive education should not be limited to children with disabilities, as it holds relevance for all marginalised groups. Though they were quick to accept that this thinking has not yet prevailed. Indian understandings of disability and educational needs are demonstrated through the interchangeable use of several English terms which hold different meanings in the north. For example, children with special needs or special educational needs tend to be perceived as children with disabilities in India, as demonstrated by Mukhopadhyay and Mani's (2002) chapter on 'Education of Children with Special Needs' in a NIEPA government-funded research report, which solely pertains to children with disabilities. In contrast, the intention of Mary Warnock's term 'special educational needs', coined in the UK in 1978, was to imply that any child, with an impairment or not, may have an individual educational need at some point in their school career (e.g. dyslexia, or language of instruction as a second language) which the teacher should adapt to. This further implies that a child with a disability may not have a special educational need while their able-bodied peers could (Giffard-Lindsay, 2006). In addition, despite the 1987 Mental Health Act finally separating the meaning of learning disability from that of mental illness in India, there is still some confusion in understanding, with the 1995 Persons with Disabilities Act listing both mental retardation and mental illness as categories of disability. Ignorance and fear of genetic inheritance adds to the societal stigma of both. 'Inclusive' and 'integrated' education are also concepts that are used interchangeably, understood as the placement of children with disabilities in mainstream classrooms, with the provision of aids and appliances, and specialist training for the teacher on how to 'deal with' students with disabilities. There is little engagement with the connotations of school, curriculum, and teacher flexibility for all children. These rigid, categorical interpretations of subtly different northern concepts are perhaps a reflection of not only the government tendency to categories and label (Julka, 2005; Singal, 2005a) but also a cultural one, most explicitly enforced through the rigidly categorised caste system.

Adult and youth literacy rates

See also 

 Gender inequality in India
 Gurukula
 List of schools in India
 Macaulayism, historical background to the implementation of English education in India.
 National Translation Mission
 Open access in India
 Two Million Minutes, documentary film
 Dreams Choked, documentary film
 Happiness Curriculum

References

Citations

Bibliography
 
  online
 
 
 
 
 Suri, R.K. and Kalapana Rajaram, eds. "Infrastructure: S&T Education", Science and Technology in India (2008), New Delhi: Spectrum, .
 India 2009: A Reference Annual (53rd edition), New Delhi: Additional Director General (ADG), Publications Division, Ministry of Information and Broadcasting, Government of India, .
 
 
 Prabhu, Joseph (2006), "Educational Institutions and Philosophies, Traditional and Modern", Encyclopedia of India (vol. 2) edited by Stanley Wolpert, 23–28, Thomson Gale: .
 Pathania, Rajni. "Literacy in India: Progress and Inequality." Bangladesh e-Journal of Sociology 17.1 (2020) online.
 Raman, S.A. (2006). "Women's Education", Encyclopedia of India (vol. 4), edited by Stanley Wolpert, 235–239, Thomson Gale: .

 
 Sripati, V. and Thiruvengadam, A.K. (2004), "India: Constitutional Amendment Making The Right to Education a Fundamental Right", International Journal of Constitutional Law, 2#1: 148–158. 
 Tilak, Jandhyala B.G. (2015) "How inclusive is higher education in India?." Social Change 45.2 (2015): 185–223 online.
 Vrat, Prem (2006), "Indian Institutes of Technology", Encyclopedia of India (vol. 2) edited by Stanley Wolpert, 229–231, Thomson Gale: .
 Desai, Sonalde, Amaresh Dubey, B.L. Joshi, Mitali Sen, Abusaleh Shariff and Reeve Vanneman. 2010. India Human Development in India: Challenges for a Society in Transition. New Delhi: Oxford University Press.

External links 

Ministry of Human Resource Development
Education statistics from the Ministry of Statistics & Programme Implementation